Abdyl Dylaveri was an Albanian politician and mayor of Elbasan from 1943 through 1944.

References

Year of birth missing
Year of death missing
Mayors of Elbasan